Marjatta (IPA: [marjatːa]) is a Finnish female given name. Its nameday is celebrated on the 15th of August. It reached its peak of popularity in the 1940s and 1950s. As of 2013 there were more than 123,000 women registered with this name in Finland. It is listed by the Finnish Population Register Centre as one of the top 10 most popular female given names ever.

Origin and variants
Marjatta is related to Marja and first appeared in the Kalevala.

Notable people
Notable people with this name include:
 Marjatta Kajosmaa (born 1938), Finnish cross country skier
 Marjatta Moulin (born 1926), Finnish fencer
 Marjatta Raita (1944-2007), Finnish actress
 Marjatta Tapiola (born 1951), Finnish painter
 Marjatta Väänänen (1923-2020), Finnish politician

References

Finnish feminine given names